4324 Bickel, provisional designation , is a stony asteroid from the middle region of the asteroid belt, approximately 12 kilometers in diameter. It was discovered on 24 December 1981, by American astronomer Laurence Taff at Lincoln Laboratory's Experimental Test Site in Socorro, New Mexico, United States. The asteroid was named after amateur astronomer Wolf Bickel.

Orbit and classification 

Bickel orbits the Sun in the central main-belt at a distance of 2.0–3.1 AU once every 4 years and 1 month (1,483 days). Its orbit has an eccentricity of 0.20 and an inclination of 8° with respect to the ecliptic.

Physical characteristics 

Bickel has been characterized as a common S-type asteroid.

Rotation period 

In September 2001, the first ever conducted photometric observation of Bickel at the Rozhen Observatory, Bulgaria, rendered a rotational lightcurve with a longer-than-average period of  hours and a brightness variation of 0.63 magnitude. A more refined lightcurve was obtained in October 2005, by astronomers Raymond Poncy, Laurent Bernasconi and Rui Goncalves, which gave a well-defined period of  hours with an amplitude of 0.72 magnitude.

Diameter and albedo 

According to observations by NASA's space-based Wide-field Infrared Survey Explorer with its subsequent NEOWISE mission, Bickel measures 11.7 kilometers in diameter and its surface has an albedo of 0.248, while the Collaborative Asteroid Lightcurve Link assumes a standard albedo for stony asteroids of 0.20 and calculates a slightly larger diameter of 12.4 kilometers with an absolute magnitude of 11.9.

Naming 

This minor planet was named in honor of German amateur astronomer Wolf Bickel (born 1942) who began observing minor planets at his private Bergisch Gladbach Observatory in 1995.

At the time this minor planet was named, he had discovered more than 540 numbered minor planets. The official naming citation was published by the Minor Planet Center on 22 July 2013. Bickel has become Germany's most prolific discoverer of asteroids, ahead of (professional) astronomer Freimut Börngen, the first time in 150 years, that an amateur astronomer is ranking first among the German top discoverers. His total number of discoveries has since increased to more than 600.

References

External links 
 VdS-Journal – Vereinigung der Sternfreunde
 Asteroid Lightcurve Database (LCDB), query form (info )
 Dictionary of Minor Planet Names, Google books
 Asteroids and comets rotation curves, CdR – Observatoire de Genève, Raoul Behrend
 Discovery Circumstances: Numbered Minor Planets (1)-(5000) – Minor Planet Center
 
 

004324
Discoveries by Laurence G. Taff
Named minor planets
19811224